The Welsh Government is the devolved government of Wales. The government consists of ministers and deputy ministers, and also of a counsel general. Ministers only attend the Cabinet Meetings of the Welsh Government. It is led by the first minister, usually the leader of the largest party in the Senedd (Welsh Parliament), who selects ministers and deputy ministers with the approval of the Senedd. The government is responsible for tabling policy in devolved areas (such as health, education, economic development, transport and local government) for consideration by the Senedd and implementing policy that has been approved by it.

The current Welsh Government is a Labour minority administration, following the 2021 Senedd election. Mark Drakeford has been the first minister of Wales since December 2018.

History

The Welsh Office
Prior to devolution in 1999 many executive functions for Wales were carried out by the Secretary of State for Wales and the Welsh Office. The Welsh Office was a department in the Government of the United Kingdom with responsibilities for Wales. It was established in April 1965 to execute government policy in Wales, and was headed by the Secretary of State for Wales, a post which had been created in October 1964. The post however had no Welsh electoral mandate, and over the ensuing years there were complaints of a "democratic deficit". For eleven years prior to 1997 Wales had been represented in the Cabinet of the United Kingdom by a Secretary of State who did not represent a Welsh constituency at Westminster. These factors led to growing calls for political devolution. The Welsh Office was disbanded on 1 July 1999 when most of its powers were transferred to the National Assembly for Wales.

Executive Committee of the National Assembly for Wales 1999 to 2007 

The National Assembly was created by the Government of Wales Act 1998, which followed a referendum in 1997. As initially established, the Welsh Government had no independent executive powers in law (unlike, for instance, the Scottish ministers and British government ministers). The National Assembly was established as a body corporate by the Government of Wales Act 1998 and the executive, as a committee of the assembly, only had those powers that the assembly as a whole voted to delegate to ministers.

The Government of Wales Act 2006 formally separated the National Assembly for Wales and the Welsh Government, giving Welsh ministers independent executive authority, this taking effect after the May 2007 elections. Following separation, the Welsh ministers exercise functions in their own right. Further transfers of executive functions from the British government can be made directly to the Welsh ministers (with their consent) by an Order in Council approved by the British parliament.

Separation was designed to clarify the respective roles of the assembly and the government. Under the structures established by the Government of Wales Act 2006, the role of Welsh ministers is to make decisions; develop and implement policy; exercise executive functions and make statutory instruments. The remainder of the 60 assembly members in the National Assembly scrutinise the government's decisions and policies; hold ministers to account; approve budgets for the Welsh Government's programmes; and enact acts of assembly on subjects that have been devolved to the Welsh administration.

The result mirrored much more closely the relationship between the British government and British parliament and that between the Scottish Government and the Scottish Parliament.

After the 2007 election of the National Assembly for Wales

Legal separation 

The new arrangements provided for in the Government of Wales Act 2006 created a formal legal separation between the National Assembly for Wales, comprising 60 assembly members, and the Welsh Assembly Government, comprising the first minister, Welsh ministers, deputy ministers and the counsel general. This separation between the two bodies took effect on the appointment of the first minister by Queen Elizabeth II following the assembly election on 3 May 2007.

Separation was meant to clarify the respective roles of the assembly and the government. The role of the government is to make decisions; develop and implement policy; exercise executive functions and make statutory instruments.  The 60 assembly members in the National Assembly scrutinise the Welsh Government's decisions and policies; hold ministers to account; approve budgets for the Welsh Government's programmes; and have the power to enact assembly measures on certain matters. Assembly measures can now go further than the subordinate legislation which the assembly had the power to make prior to 2007.

Transfer of functions 

The assembly's functions, including that of making subordinate legislation, in the main, transferred to the Welsh ministers upon separation. A third body was also established under the 2006 Act from May 2007, called the National Assembly for Wales Commission. It employs the staff supporting the new National Assembly for Wales, and holds property, enters into contracts and provides support services on its behalf.

Welsh ministers 

The 2006 Act made new provision for the appointment of Welsh ministers. The first minister is nominated by the Senedd and then appointed by His Majesty the King. The first minister then appoints the Welsh ministers and the deputy Welsh ministers with the approval of the monarch. The Act created a new post of Counsel General for Wales, the principal source of legal advice to the Welsh Government. The counsel general is appointed by the monarch, on the nomination of the first minister, whose recommendation must be agreed by the Senedd and who cannot be dismissed without the Senedd's consent, but automatically leaves office when a new first minister is nominated. The counsel general may be, but does not have to be, a member of the Senedd. The Act permits a maximum of 12 Welsh ministers, which includes deputy Welsh ministers, but excludes the first minister and the counsel general. Accordingly, the maximum size of the Welsh Government is 14.

In Acts of the Senedd and of the UK Parliament, the expression "the Welsh Ministers" is used to refer to the Welsh government in similar contexts to those where "the Secretary of State" would be used to refer to the British government; it is defined to include only the first minister and ministers, not the deputy ministers or the counsel general.

2011 referendum on law-making powers

Functions and areas of competence 

Following the "yes" vote in the referendum on further law-making powers for the assembly on 3 March 2011, the Welsh Government is now entitled to propose bills to the National Assembly for Wales on subjects within 20 fields of policy. Subject to limitations prescribed by the Government of Wales Act 2006, Acts of the National Assembly may make any provision that could be made by Act of Parliament. The 20 areas of responsibility devolved to the National Assembly for Wales (and within which Welsh ministers exercise executive functions) are:

Agriculture, fisheries, forestry and rural development
Ancient monuments and historical buildings
Culture
Economic development
Education and training
Environment
Fire and rescue services and promotion of fire safety
Food
Health and social services
Highways and transport
Housing
Local government
National Assembly for Wales
Public administration
Social welfare
Sport and recreation
Tourism
Town and country planning
Water and flood defences
Welsh language

Renaming 
The Welsh Assembly Government was renamed Welsh Government in practice in 2011, and in law by the Wales Act 2014.

Cabinet members and deputy ministers 

The government is composed of ministers and deputy ministers. The counsel general is also a member of the Cabinet. The current government is a minority by Welsh Labour.

Deputy ministers

Civil service 
The Welsh Government also includes a civil service that supports the Welsh ministers. As of March 2018, there are 5,015 full-time equivalent civil servants working across Wales. The civil service is a matter reserved to the British Parliament at Westminster: Welsh Government civil servants work within the rules and customs of His Majesty's Civil Service, but serve the devolved administration rather than the British Government.

Permanent secretary 
The Permanent Secretary heads the civil service of the Welsh Government and chairs the Strategic Delivery and Performance Board.

The Permanent Secretary is a member of His Majesty's Civil Service, and therefore takes part in the Permanent Secretaries Management Group of the Civil Service and is answerable to the most senior civil servant in Britain, the Cabinet Secretary, for his or her professional conduct. He or she remains, however, at the direction of the Welsh ministers.

 Sir Jon Shortridge (May 1999 to April 2008)
 Dame Gillian Morgan (May 2008 to August 2012)
 Sir Derek Jones (October 2012 to February 2017)
 Dame Shan Elizabeth Morgan (February 2017 to 31 October 2021)
 Andrew Goodall (November 2021 to date)

Departments 
Office of the First Minister 
Cabinet Division
Cabinet Office
Co-operation Agreement Unit 
Permanent Secretary's Office
Propriety and Ethics Directorate 
Chief Operating Officer's Group
Finance Directorate
Care Inspectorate Wales
Communications Division
Health Inspectorate Wales
Planning & Environment Decisions Wales 
Commercial and Procurement Directorate 
HR Directorate
Digital, Data & Technology Directorate 
Covid Recovery & Local Government Group
Risk, Resilience and Community Safety Directorate
Local Government Directorate
North Wales Division
Climate Change & Rural Affairs Group
Sustainable Transport & Digital Infrastructure Directorate
Climate Change, Energy & Planning Directorate
Housing & Regeneration Directorate
Office of the Chief Veterinary Officer
Environmental Sustainability Directorate 
Rural Affairs Directorate
Finance and Operations Directorate
Economy, Treasury & Constitution Group
Welsh Treasury
International Relations & Trade Directorate
Regional Investment & Borders Directorate
Constitution & Justice Directorate
Legal Services Directorate
Office of the Legislative Counsel
Welsh Government Office for Science
Business & Regions Directorate
Culture, Sport & Tourism Directorate
Finance and Operations Directorate 
Education, Social Justice & Welsh Language Group
Social Partnership, Employability and Fair Work Directorate
Education & Welsh Language Directorate
Communities & Tackling Poverty Directorate
Operations Directorate 
Ukraine Response Directorate 
Health & Social Services Group
Office of the Chief Executive of NHS Wales
Office of the Chief Medical Officer for Wales
Health and Wellbeing Directorate
Health Protection Directorate 
Quality & Nursing Directorate
Social Services & Integration Directorate
NHS Performance & Planning Directorate
NHS Finance Directorate
Community & Primary Care, Mental Health & Vulnerable Groups Directorate
Digital, Technology & Innovation Directorate
Workforce & Corporate Services Directorate
CAFCASS Cymru

The Board 

The Welsh Government Board translates the strategic direction set by the Welsh cabinet and its committees into work that is joined up across Welsh Government departments and makes the best use of its resources. The board is made up of six directors general, six directors and four non-executive directors, and is chaired by the permanent secretary.

Board members are appointed at the discretion of and by the permanent secretary. Membership is not wholly dependent on functional responsibilities; it is designed to provide balanced advice and support to the permanent secretary, and collective leadership to the organisation as a whole.

Welsh Government sponsored bodies 

The Welsh Government is responsible for a number of Welsh Government sponsored bodies (WGSBs). These are, respectively,

executive WGSBs, which are non-departmental public bodies such as the Arts Council of Wales;
advisory WGSBs, which are non-departmental public bodies; and
tribunals such as the Mental Health Review Tribunal for Wales.

WGSBs are staffed by public servants rather than civil servants.

The Welsh Government is also responsible for some public bodies that are not classed as WGSBs, such as NHS Wales, and the Welsh Offices of England and Wales legal offices.

Estate 
The Welsh Government has a total of 18 core and operational offices across Wales. It also has an office based in Westminster. Additionally, it has 7 specialist properties across Wales, which include stores, traffic management centres and the pavilion at the Royal Welsh Showground.

The Government also has 21 offices located in 11 countries outside the United Kingdom: Belgium; Canada; China; France; Germany; Ireland; India; Japan; Qatar; United Arab Emirates, and the United States of America.

Historically, most Welsh Office staff were based in Cardiff, especially in Cathays Park. However, in 2002, the Fullerton Review concluded that "the Assembly could no longer sustain having the majority of its operational functions located in and around Cardiff". Since 2004, Welsh Government civil servants have been relocated across Wales as part of the Location Strategy, which involved the creation of new offices at Merthyr Tydfil, Aberystwyth and Llandudno Junction. In 2006, the mergers of ELWa, the Wales Tourist Board and the Welsh Development Agency into the Welsh Government brought these agencies' offices into the Welsh Government estate.

The office of the First Minister is in Tŷ Hywel in Cardiff Bay; an office is also kept at the Welsh Government building in Cathays Park where the majority of Cardiff-based Welsh Government civil servants are located.

Budget 

Wales receives a budget allocation from the UK Government determined by the Barnett Formula, which makes up roughly 80% of the Welsh budget. The remaining 20% comes from devolved taxes such as non-domestic rates, land transaction tax, landfill disposal tax and the Welsh rates of income tax. These taxes are collected and managed by the Welsh Revenue Authority, except for income tax which is collected by His Majesty’s Revenue and Customs on behalf of the Welsh Government.

The Welsh Government sets out its spending and financing plans for the forthcoming financial year in the autumn.

The Senedd scrutinises the budget and associated taxation and spending plans.

List of successive Welsh Government ministries

See also 

 List of political parties in Wales
 List of Wales-related topics
 Government spending in the United Kingdom
 Welsh Youth Parliament
 Welsh devolution

References

External links 
 
 Welsh Government Ministers
 Law Wales Website – Home

 
1999 establishments in Wales
Economy of Wales
Organisations based in Cardiff
Politics of Wales
Articles containing video clips